Hannam-dong is a dong, neighbourhood of Yongsan-gu in Seoul, South Korea. One of the most affluent neighborhoods in the country, it has been portrayed continuously in South Korea's popular culture as a wealthy and luxurious spot, and for this it has been the subject of domestic films, television series, and Korean pop music.

Initially not included within the Yongsan ward, during the Japanese colonial period it was a small hamlet called Han River Village (한강리/) within the Hanji township (한지면/), Goyang County (고양군/) and lying close to the Han River.

Being right across the river from the Gangnam area of Seoul and its proximity to locations in northern Seoul makes the neighborhood centrally located in Seoul. Many celebrities and executives live in three well known residential areas in the neighborhood: UN Village, The Hill, and Nine One Hannam.  Beginning in the 2010s, the area has grown into a trendy hotspot both day and night with boutique cafes, restaurants and bars proliferating in the area. The area also has a large concentration of foreign and expatriate residents, mainly business executives and diplomats.

Attractions
 Leeum, Samsung Museum of Art
 Pace Gallery, Seoul Location
 Thaddaeus Ropac, Seoul Location
 SOUNDS Hannam, a cultural complex
 Mosu Seoul, a 2-Michelin Star Restaurant
 Soseoul Hannam, a 1-Michelin Star Restaurant

Education 
Primary schools
 Seoul Hannam Elementary School

International schools:
 German School Seoul International

 Yongsan International School of Seoul (YISS)

Dulwich College Seoul, a British school, is about 15 minutes away by car.

Previously the French School of Seoul was in Hannam-dong. In 1985 it moved to Seorae Village in Banpo-dong, Seocho-gu.

Transportation 
 Hangangjin Station of 
 Hannam Station of

See also 
Administrative divisions of South Korea

References

External links
 Yongsan-gu official website
 Yongsan-gu official website
 Hannam 1-dong resident office website

Neighbourhoods of Yongsan District